Spilarctia hypsoides is a moth in the family Erebidae. It was described by Walter Rothschild in 1914. It is found in Papua, Indonesia.

References

Moths described in 1914
hypsoides